Strangled Lives is a 1996 French-Italian crime film directed by Ricky Tognazzi. It was entered into the 46th Berlin International Film Festival where it won the Alfred Bauer Prize.

Cast
 Vincent Lindon as Francesco
 Sabrina Ferilli as Miriam
 Luca Zingaretti as Sergio
 Ricky Memphis as Claudio
 Lina Sastri as Sauro
 Francesco Venditti as Robertino
 Violante Placido as Laura
 Vittorio Amandola as Antiquario
 Giuseppe Manfridi as Brizzi
 Marilyn Pater as Consuelo
 Giuppy Izzo as Daniela
 Antonello Morroni as Faina

References

External links

1996 films
Italian crime drama films
1990s Italian-language films
1996 crime drama films
Films directed by Ricky Tognazzi
Films scored by Ennio Morricone
French crime drama films
1990s French films
1990s Italian films